Joel Ladd Thomas (born December 13, 1966) is an American former competition swimmer and Olympic gold medalist.

Attended John Muir High School.

At the 1991 Pan American Games in Havana, Cuba, Thomas won a gold medal as a member of the winning U.S. team in the 4×100-meter medley relay.  Individually, he also received a silver medal for finishing second in the 100-meter freestyle event.

Thomas represented the United States at the 1992 Summer Olympics in Barcelona, Spain.  He received a gold medal for swimming for the first-place U.S. team in the preliminary heats of the men's 4×100-meter freestyle relay.

See also
 List of Olympic medalists in swimming (men)
 List of University of California, Berkeley alumni

References

External links
 

1966 births
Living people
American male freestyle swimmers
California Golden Bears men's swimmers
Olympic gold medalists for the United States in swimming
Sportspeople from Pasadena, California
Swimmers at the 1991 Pan American Games
Swimmers at the 1992 Summer Olympics
Medalists at the 1992 Summer Olympics
Pan American Games gold medalists for the United States
Pan American Games medalists in swimming
Universiade medalists in swimming
Universiade gold medalists for the United States
Medalists at the 1987 Summer Universiade
Medalists at the 1991 Pan American Games